Panorama Hills is a suburban residential neighbourhood in the northwest quadrant of Calgary, Alberta. Located at the northern edge of the city, north of Country Hills boulevard.

The neighbourhood Coventry Hills is directly east.

The community was established in 1994, built by Ultima Development Corporation on land purchased from members of the Country Hills Golf Course. It is represented in the Calgary City Council by the Ward 3 councillor.

The historical sites Reverend George McDougall Cairn and the John A. Lewis Rock Quarry are located within the neighbourhood, and it borders the Country Hills golf course to the southwest.

Demographics

Residents in this community had a median household income of $89,044 in 2005, and there were 5.2% low income residents living in the neighbourhood. As of 2006, 41.7% of the residents were immigrants. Most buildings are single-family detached homes, and 2.3% of the housing was used for renting.

Developers
Currently the Only Know Developers by Public Information of Panorama Hills are Jayman Built, Cedarglen Homes, Shane Homes, Homes by Avi and Cardel Homes.

Education
Students in the Catholic district attend St. Jerome Elementary School, St Elizabeth Seton and Notre Dame (10-12) High School. Students in the public district attend Panorama Hills Elementary School (K-5), Buffalo Rubbing Stone Elementary School (K-5), Dr. J. K. Mulloy Elementary School (K-4), Balmoral School (5-9), Captain Nichola Goddard Middle School (6-9), Sir John A Macdonald Junior High School, and John G. Diefenbaker High School (10-12).

See also
List of neighbourhoods in Calgary

References

External links
Northern Hills (Cinnamon Hills, Country Hills, Coventry Hills, Harvest Hills, Panorama Hills) Community Association

Neighbourhoods in Calgary